ORP Dzik (Boar) was a U-class submarine built by Vickers-Armstrong at Barrow-in-Furness. She was laid down on 30 December 1941 as P-52 for the Royal Navy, but was transferred to the Polish Navy during construction.  Launched on November 11, 1942, ORP Dzik was commissioned into the Polish Navy on December 12, 1942. Her name meant "Wild Boar" in Polish.

24 May 1943 Near Cape Spartivento, ORP Dzik fired a 4 torpedo salvo and damaged the Italian oil tanker Carnaro (8357 Gross Register Tonnage). After the attack, two Italian corvettes dropped over 60 depth charges.

21 Sep 1943 ORP Dzik fired torpedoes in Bastia harbour, Corsica, France and sank the German tanker Nikolaus (6397, former Greek Nikolaou Ourania) and the German tug Kraft (333 Gross Register Tonnage).

8 Jan 1944 ORP Dzik sank the Greek sailing vessel Eleni (200 Gross Register Tonnage) with gunfire off Lesbos Island, Greece in position 39.37N, 25.43E.

ORP Dzik destroyed or damaged 18 surface ships both German and Italian with a total tonnage of 45,080 tons.  She participated in Operation Husky, the Allied invasion of Sicily, and also engaged enemy surface ships with her 76 mm cannon three times and the crew boarded two enemy ships.  The ORP Dzik earned the Jolly Roger.

In July 1946, the Polish Navy decommissioned her and returned her to the Royal Navy.

In 1947, the ship was transferred to the Royal Danish Navy. She sailed as HDMS U-1 and was later renamed to HDMS Springeren. She was returned to the Royal Navy in April 1958 and scrapped.

Commanding officers 
 August 28, 1942 - November 1944: Capt. Bolesław Romanowski
 November 1944 - December 31, 1944: Lt. Tadeusz Noworol
 January 1, 1945 - August 25, 1946: Capt. Andrzej Kłopotowski

References
 
 
 
 Submarines, War Beneath The Waves, From 1776 To The Present Day, by Robert Hutchinson

 

British U-class submarines
Ships built in Barrow-in-Furness
1942 ships
British U-class submarines of the Polish Navy
World War II submarines of Poland
British U-class submarines of the Royal Danish Navy